Acoacán is a small town in eastern Equatorial Guinea, in the province of Wele-Nzas.

It is the birthplace of President Teodoro Obiang Nguema Mbasogo.

Populated places in Wele-Nzas